The Saigon Heat is a Vietnamese professional basketball team based in Ho Chi Minh City, Vietnam founded in 2016. It is the developmental team of the Saigon Heat. The team currently competes in the Vietnam Basketball Association, Vietnam's first professional basketball league.

History
Following the completion of the 2015–16 season, the Heat announced the formation of Vietnam's first professional basketball league, the Vietnam Basketball Association, where they would field a developmental team. The Heat VBA team consists of local players, with several of the ABL side's players being distributed among the other VBA teams for league parity.
In 2019, 2020 and 2022 they became the first team to win 3 consecutive Vietnam Basketball Association championship series.

Season-by-season record

Current roster

References

External links
  
  

Vietnam Basketball Association teams
Basketball teams established in 2016
Basketball teams in Vietnam
2016 establishments in Vietnam